Let's Fish! Hooked On, also known in Japan as Let's Try Bass Fishing, FISH ON NEXT, is an anime fishing game developed for the PlayStation Vita. It was created by Sims Co., Ltd and published by Wired Productions with character designs by Poyoyon Rock. The game is an arcade fishing game with a story mode spread across four characters in total, with numerous fishing tournaments taking up the majority of the game.

Plot 
Multiple gameplay plots are available in World Tour mode, where the player gets to choose between the four different characters to play as, each with their own story line and game play. The game's plot differs depending on which character is chosen.
Ryuji (Akita) (アキタ リュウジ, voiced by Kentaro Ito) is 19 years old and has joined the World Tour to follow in the footsteps of his father, a world-famous fishing champion.
Jamie (ジェイミー, voiced by Ai Shimizu) is 17 years old and follows her childhood friend Ryuji to the tournament and decides to join it herself after being goaded by Kano.
Kano (Makise) (マキセ カノ, voiced by Shizuka Ito) is 19 years old and wants to be a champion while making friends at the same time.
Ai (Shimizu) (シミズ アイ, voiced by Ai Shimizu) is 17 years old and is a magical girl who wants to bring world peace through the medium of fishing.

Gameplay
Let's Fish! Hooked On has four main games modes:
World Tour acts as the game's story mode. Players can develop their character skills and technique in a series of progressively more difficult tournaments. Players can choose between four characters, each coming with their own storylines. To achieve World Champion status, players must battle through 35 Amateur, Professional, and Master Class tournaments. 
Challenge mode contains short fishing-based challenges, as well as online ranking. 
Training is the practice mode of the game which allow players to fish in any season, time, and stage.
Underwater allows players to view the fish they have caught and observe their behavior.

References

External links 
  
  
 Official Facebook Page

2012 video games
Fishing video games
PlayStation Network games
PlayStation Vita games
PlayStation Vita-only games
SIMS Co., Ltd. games
Single-player video games
Video games developed in Japan
Wired Productions games